Noseite is a village in Tryavna Municipality, in Gabrovo Province, in northern central Bulgaria.

Nosei Glacier on Smith Island, Antarctica is named after the village.

References

Villages in Gabrovo Province